The Ife Empire was the first empire in Yoruba history. It was founded in what is now southwestern Nigeria and eastern Benin today. The Ife Empire lasted from 1200 to 1420. The empire was founded by Odùduwà and became well-known for its sophisticated art pieces. Although Yoruba was the main language of the empire, there were also various spoken dialects and languages. It rose to power through trade with Sahelian and  forest states. Its capital city, Ilé-Ife, was one of the largest urban centers in 14th century West Africa.

History

Formation and early history
The Ife region began as a small collection of house societies in mid-first millennium, which over time grew to become “mega houses”, or mini-states, due to competition for resources. Over time, as managing resources, population, and conflicts presented opportunities for new organizational structures, several of the mega-houses started organizing themselves into confederacy-like associations. The most prominent of these was the Ife “confederacy". Conflicts over resources continued however, exacerbated by the aridity and a rising population.

During said conflicts, a group of people led by a confederacy leader named Odùduwà emerged, building a large perimeter wall between the 10th to 11th centuries. The building of the wall led to a massive conflict between the Odùduwà group and another mega-house, lead by a man named Obatálá. The Odùduwà group ended up winning the conflict.

leaders such as Odùduwà and Obatálá would later be Deified after death, becoming core parts of the Yoruba traditional religion.

According to oral traditions, a conference was soon held at Ìta Ìjerò in Ilé-Ifè following the triumph of the Odùduwà group in the Obatálá-Odùduwà conflict. At the end of the conference, each the princes present left to establish his own kingdom such as Benin and Oyo, with the promise that they would all keep in touch as brothers and support one another in times of trouble..

Benin, one such of the kingdoms under Ife, wasn't created by the Yorubas, but was brought under their rule when Oraniyan, a Yoruba prince, was invited by Benin kingmakers to overthrow the former Benin ruling dynasty, the "Ogiso" dynasty, and establish a new one, the Oba dynasty. Modern scholars place this event as happening between ca. 1200 and ca. 1250. It was under Oranmiyan that the country received a new name: Ile-Ibinu (from its former name of Igodomigodo), which would later be corrupted to "Benin".

Classical Period (1000–1420 AD) 

Once the Obatálá-Odùduwà conflict ended, a new era began, known as the Classical period. The sociopolitical outcome of the following instability was qualitatively different from that of the preceding era. The hallmarks of the Classical period include the development of an urban capital with concentric embankments. There were also life-size terracotta and copper or brass sculptures with detailed, idealized naturalism.

Craft specialization defined everyday economic life in which the production of high-value crafts, such as glass-bead production, featured prominently. Ife grew to have a robust industry in metals, producing high-quality iron and even steel.

As the population grew, a second wall was built in the capital city Ilé-Ife during the thirteenth century and the construction and pavement of several major roads began as well. The occurrence of potsherd pavements in virtually every part of the area within the Inner and Outer Walls and beyond indicate that the city was densely populated. It is estimated that the city of Ilé-Ifè had a population of 70,000–105,000 during the mid-fourteenth century.

Ife's prominence grew so much that it was even possibly mentioned on a 1375 Spanish trade map known as the Catalan Atlas, under the name Rey de Organa. The name Organa alludes to the title of first dynasty Ife rulers, i.e. Ógáne (Óghéné, Ógéne̩). The same name is referenced in a Portuguese account from the 1480s about an inland ruler who played a central role in Benin royal enthronements.

At its zenith in the 14th century, the Ife empire stretched across around three hundred kilometers and encompassed Owu, Jebba, Tada, and Oyo in the north and Benin and Ijebu in the south. 

as Ife grew it became more ethnically diverse, with the northern parts of Ife around the Niger river and in Oyo having multiple other ethnic groups living with the Yorubas, the Nupe, Ìbàrìbá, and various Songhai peoples of which the Djerma were most prominent. The various ethnic groups all migrated to Ife for commercial and resource opportunities. The Djerma were the main carriers of Yoruba goods into the Sahel during the classical period and showed a good amount of political and religious influence.

Trade

The Ife Empire was one of the oldest trading empires in west Africa and an early partner in the trans-saharan trade. One of Ife's earliest trade routes was up the Niger to gao, the route became active as early as the ninth century.

Glass beads were one of the most sought after items in west Africa during this time and Ife had a near monopoly of this market. Ife was likely the third place in the world glass was indigenously invented. Dichroic glass beads from Ilé-Ifè Have been found at Kissi in Burkina Faso, Diouboye in Senegal, Gao Ancien, Essouk in Mali, and Koumbi Saleh in Mauritania, all in twelfth- to fourteenth-century contexts. Ilé-Ifè, was the only known industrial center for HLHA glass production.

Ife's fame spread far and wide, Ibn Battuta was informed during his visit to Mali about a powerful kingdom to the south called Yufı which he described as “one of the most considerable countries of the Sudan, and their sultan, one of the greatest sultans". He goes on further calling Yufi as a country that “no white man can enter . . . because the negros will kill him before he arrives”. Ife was most likely Yufi, Akinwumi Ogundiran writes "Ilé-Ifè was the largest urban center, the biggest emporium, and the wealthiest polity in West Africa’s rain forest belt south of the Niger River during the mid-fourteenth century, with more than two centuries of trading contact with the Western Sudan. On account of these facts alone, it is the best match for Ibn Battuta’s Yufi. Moreover, on linguistic grounds, Yufı is a Mandé or an Arabic transliteration of “Ufè.,” the proper name for “Ifè.” in central Yorùbá dialect."

The Bead Road is the name given by akinwumi ogundiran of the trade route, which stretched from Ilé-Ifè to the Moshi-Niger area and as far as the Niger Bend in present-day Mali. Another possible mention of Ife are the Records of 11th to 14th century Arab scholars that reveal trade in blue dichroic West African glass beads. Items traded to Ife were Saharan copper and salt, Mediterranean and Chinese silk and other clothing materials, they entering the region from across the Niger by the eleventh or twelfth century. In exchange, Ife would trade sundry rain forest goods, of which glass beads and ivory were the most highly prized.

Ife was also likely a part of the Silk Trade on the Silk Road between the twelfth through fifteenth centuries, with long-distance trade routes going up all the way to Nubia from Kanem during 1300s. Evidence for this are coptic cross motifs found on objects, burial sites, and statues in the Ife Empire region. Historic Ife ritual contexts also suggest possible early Coptic Christian contact through long distance trade. There is also likely Ife regalia modeled on an ancient Nubian shield ring that probably reached the area between the twelfth through fourteenth Century era through trade.

Evidence also shows that during Ife's time period, Yorubaland was involved in trade with southwestern Cameroon.

Architecture

Dwellings had a clay terrace and wooden posts to hold up the roof. Floors were paved with potsherd tiles, ceramic tiles, and cobblestone. The walls and columns of elite buildings were decorated with ceramic disks. Most of the potsherd tiles were arranged linearly in herringbone patterns, and black and red sherds were arranged in geometric mosaics. Leo Frobenius, a 20th-century archeologist who visited Nigeria also noted that the foundations of historical buildings at Ile-Ife were built of burnt bricks. By the early 20th century, he said Ife's architecture has greatly regressed from what it reached in antiquity. The capital Ile Ife was surrounded by two concentric walls, which were around 15 feet high and 6 feet thick. Remains of impluvia paved with the sherds of broken pottery, have been revealed through archaeological works. The impluvia were drained by clay or grindstone pipes.

Conflicts
One of Ife's northernmost provinces, Owu, controlled the trade connecting the rest of Ife and western Sudan, where Ifè glass beads passed into the Middle Niger valley. With control of the trade and profit they began buying horses from the Wasangari, Mossi, Mandé, and Songhai in the early 14th century and became the first cavalry state in Ife. Owu's newfound power expanded rapidly with the use of calvary and Òwu began to undermine the commercial and political interests of Ifè, and eventually declared war on Ife, starting a civil war.

Evidence also shows Ife was likely dealing with Islamic expansions during the 14th century. A group of rock carvings found around nine miles south of Ife show carved images including hands holding a sword, bound arms, a decapitated man, another sword, two clusters of spears, a tortoise, a snake, what seems to be a leopard, and a Muslim prayer board. The carving seems to depict a battle. Since the carving shows obatala linked animals and a Muslim prayer board it likely implies that the battle that took place involved people from local and foreign religions(Islam). The battle seems all the more significant considering the interest shown in providing evidence of it. The Muslim prayer board offers evidence that the wars that were taking place in the Ife area as with regions to the north and east in this era (from modern Chad to Mali) involved local populations in contestation with Islamic troops.

Decline
Many factors led to Ife's ultimate demise by 1420. These included long spells of drought that kicked off around 1380 across West and East Africa, political disturbances in Western Sudan like the collapse of the Mali Empire, internal crisis within the Ife Empire, and an epidemic that was most likely smallpox or even possibly the black death.

References

Sources

History of Nigeria
Ife